Bobby Bass (occasionally Bob Bass) (August 6, 1936 in California – November 7, 2001) was an American actor, stunt performer, and stunt coordinator/second unit director.

Early life
Bass, a graduate of Morningside High School in Inglewood, California, was an enthusiast of the martial arts. As a teenager, he became a judo champion, meeting Gene LeBell who introduced him to the stunt industry in Hollywood.

Bass served in the military, initially as a paratrooper in the 82nd Airborne Division and then in Special Forces to become a special forces instructor. He resumed competing in judo and attained the rank of third degree black belt.

Career
Bass made a career in movies and television in a variety of genres working with Burt Reynolds, Sylvester Stallone, and John Wayne. He taught martial arts and weapons handling to Geena Davis, Michael Douglas, Mel Gibson, Danny Glover, Susan Sarandon, and Kathleen Turner. Bass appeared in TV commercials and TV series such as Fantasy Island, MacGyver, Mission: Impossible, Star Trek: The Original Series, The A-Team, and The Twilight Zone.

Bass also championed safer working conditions for the stunt industry, especially after his then-fiancée and Melanie Griffith's best friend, Heidi von Beltz, was paralyzed performing a stunt that Bass had coordinated in 1980 for Cannonball Run. He abandoned her after the accident, and von Beltz was awarded $4.6 million in a wrongful-injury lawsuit.

Personal life
Bass had two sons with his first wife. His second wife was Norma Collins, whom he was married to until his death. He was stepfather to Collins' four children, including actress Bo Derek. He suffered from Parkinson's disease until his death by suicide in Los Angeles.

Filmography

References

External links
 

1936 births
2001 deaths
American stunt performers
Male actors from Los Angeles
Morningside High School alumni